Konrad Aksinowicz is Polish film, TV commercial and music video director and writer.

Films
Whilst in high school he started creating short films, one of which Alabama won him the Minister of Education prize in 1996.

He studied filmmaking at School of Visual Arts in Sydney, Australia. Then took up a course of screenwriting in Fox Studio under the guidance of Robert McKee, which changed his attitude towards story concept. He returned to Poland in 2004 where he gained recognition as a TV commercial and music video director.

His films Zamiana and W spirali were nominees to the "Golden Duck Award" at the Gdynia Film Festival, the latter also nominated for the "Golden Claw" category.

On 10 December 2021 his film Powrót do tamtych dni with Maciej Stuhr, Weronika Książkiewicz and Teodor Koziar was released in the cinemas. The film was well received at the Tallinn Black Nights Film Festival in 2021 and received the Youth Film Award as part of the Just Film section.

Music videos
He directed and created music videos for Margaret on songs on her album Monkey Business; What You Do, Byle jak and Blue Vibes. 

He also directed Doda's Nie wolno płakać and Nie mam dokąd wracać music videos.

Personal life
He is a big fan of Star Wars, LEGO and The Muppet Show.

His father was an alcoholic and he has spoken about his AAS syndrome resulting from that experience. The film Powrót Tamtych Dni is based on these events and was widely commented within his own family.

References

Polish film directors
Living people
1978 births
Film people from Wrocław